Megumi Harada is a mathematician who works as a professor in the department of mathematics and statistics at McMaster University, where she holds a tier-two Canada Research Chair in Equivariant Symplectic and Algebraic Geometry.

Research
Harada's research involves the symmetries of symplectic spaces and their connections to other areas of mathematics including algebraic geometry, representation theory, K-theory, and algebraic combinatorics.

Education and career
Dr. Harada went to high school in the United States. Harada graduated in 1996 from Harvard University, with a bachelor's degree in mathematics. She completed her doctorate in 2003 from the University of California, Berkeley. Her dissertation, The Symplectic Geometry of the Gel'fand-Cetlin-Molev Basis for Representations of Sp(2n, C), concerned symplectic geometry and was supervised by Allen Knutson.

After postdoctoral studies at the University of Toronto, she joined the McMaster faculty in 2006.

Recognition
In 2013, Harada won the Ruth I. Michler Memorial Prize of the Association for Women in Mathematics, funding her travel to Cornell University for research collaborations with Reyer Sjamar, Tara S. Holm, and Allen Knutson. She was given her Canada Research Chair in 2014. She is the 2018 winner of the Krieger–Nelson Prize "for her research on Newton–Okounkov bodies, Hessenberg varieties, and their relationships to symplectic geometry, combinatorics, and equivariant topology, among others".

References

External links
Home page

Year of birth missing (living people)
Living people
Canadian women mathematicians
Harvard University alumni
University of California, Berkeley alumni
Academic staff of McMaster University
Canada Research Chairs
Algebraic geometers
20th-century Canadian mathematicians
21st-century Canadian mathematicians
20th-century women mathematicians
21st-century women mathematicians
20th-century Canadian women scientists